Et Lux is a classical and choral studio album by German composer Wolfgang Rihm, and played by an orchestra with the Huelgas Ensemble with the Minguet Quartett. This album was released in the label ECM New Series in March 2015.

Composition
Like Rihm's participation in the Requiem of Reconciliation, the album is a reworking of the Roman Catholic mass for the dead.

In Et Lux he uses a few specific text fragments from the mass, for example “et lux perpetua luceat” (and let perpetual light shine upon them) used to pray for eternal light for the deceased, which appear as components of a progressively realized whole.

On the album, the conductor, Paul Van Nevel, doubled the vocal part.

Reception
In The Guardian, Kate Molleson gave the album four stars and says that "this music treads the line of tangibility, with sudden rushes of anger or fondness and the messy half-memories that come with grief" and adds that "Conductor Paul van Nevel doubles the vocal parts to create broad, generous textures that sound lovely and lush against the strings' icy clarity – all qualities that ECM's engineers are expert at capturing".In Gramophone, Arnold Whittall says that "while some of the more austere episodes might strain the listener's concentration, they are set against eruptive, even melodramatic passages that demonstrate Rihm's special ability to make something distinctively edgy out of meditation and reflection."

Track listing
ECM New Series – ECM 2404 NS.

Personnel

Huelgas Ensemble – choir
Minguet Quartett – choir
Axelle Bernage – soprano
Sabine Lutzenberger – soprano
Terry Wey – tenor
Achim Schulz – tenor
Stefan Berghammer – tenor
Matthew Vine – tenor
Tim Whitheley – bass
Guillaume Orly – bass
Ulrich Isfort – violin
Annette Reisinger – violin
Aroa Sorin – viola
Matthias Diener – violoncello
Paul Van Nevel – conductor

References

ECM Records albums
ECM New Series albums
2015 albums
Albums produced by Manfred Eicher